Jani Lehtinen (born 23 February 1974) is a Finnish racewalker. He competed in the men's 50 kilometres walk at the 1996 Summer Olympics and the 2004 Summer Olympics.

References

1974 births
Living people
Athletes (track and field) at the 1996 Summer Olympics
Athletes (track and field) at the 2004 Summer Olympics
Finnish male racewalkers
Olympic athletes of Finland
Place of birth missing (living people)